Dame Janne Haaland Matláry (born 27 April 1957) is a Norwegian political scientist, writer, and politician, who formerly represented the Christian Democratic Party. Since 2012 she has been a member of the Conservative Party. She is Professor of international politics at the University of Oslo, and served as State Secretary in the Ministry of Foreign Affairs (1997–2000).

Life and career
She claimed the Christian democratic ideology was incompatible with the socialist ideology. 

She spoke at the Humanum interreligious colloquium, in 2014. The event, held at the Vatican, was centered on discussions of marriage and the family.

Affiliations
She is a member of the Pontifical Council for Justice and Peace and of the Pontifical Academy of Social Sciences, and a consultor of the Pontifical Council for the Family. In 2001 she was made a Dame in the Sovereign Military Order of Malta. She is also member of IESE's International Advisory Board (IAB).

Family
Janne Haaland is married to Dr. Matláry, a physician of Hungarian origin who came to Norway as a refugee. The couple has four children.

Writings
Political Factors in Western European Gas Trade (NUPI rapport). Norsk Utenrikspolitisk Institutt, Oslo 1985; ISBN B0006EOPL0
Norway's New Interdependence with the European Community: The Political and Economic Implications of Gas Trade (NUPI rapport). Utenrikspolitisk Institutt, Oslo 1990; ISBN B0006EVW8E
Energy Policy in the European Union. Palgrave Macmillan, 1997; 
Intervention for Human Rights in Europe. Palgrave Macmillan, 2002; 
Values and Weapons: From Humanitarian Intervention to Regime Change? Palgrave Macmillan, 2006; 
Faith through Reason.
When Might Becomes Human Right. Gracewing, 2007; 
European Union Security Dynamics: In the New National Interest. Palgrave Macmillan, 2009;

References

External links
Staff page at Oslo University.
Author page at Macmillan.
Matlary's page at the Pontifical Academy of Social Sciences
"Norwegian Saga: The Conversion of Janne Haaland Matlary. New Book by a Former Foreign-Affairs Official", Zenit, 3 May 2004.
"Nurturing a New Feminism", Zenit, 22 May 2001.
"More Women Leaders Needed at the Vatican" by Carol Glatz, Catholic News Service, 15 Dec. 2008.

1947 births
Living people
Christian Democratic Party (Norway) politicians
Converts to Roman Catholicism from atheism or agnosticism
Dames of Malta
Members of the Pontifical Academy of Social Sciences
Norwegian political scientists
International relations scholars
Norwegian Roman Catholics
Norwegian state secretaries
People from Mandal, Norway
University of Oslo alumni
Women political scientists